The 2000–01 season Swiss Football League contains two divisions, the Swiss Super League, at the time called Nationalliga A, and the Swiss Challenge League, at the time called Nationalliga B (in  and ). At the end of the season, Nationalliga A held its own championship playoffs, and Nationalliga B held its own relegation playoffs. Additionally, the last 4 teams from A and top 4 teams from B held a relegation/promotion playoff.

Nationalliga A

Regular season
The Qualification Round to the League season 2000–01 was contested by twelve teams. The first eight teams of the regular season (or Qualification) then competed in the Championship Playoff Round. The teams in the ninth to twelfth positions completed with the top four teams of the Nationalliga B in a Nationalliga A/B Playoff round. The regular season (Grunddurchgang) started on 15 July and ended on 10 December. At the end of the season Grasshopper Club Zürich won the championship.

Table

Results

Champion playoffs
The first eight teams of the regular season (or Qualification) competed in the Championship Playoff Round. They took half of the points (rounded up to complete units) gained in the Qualification as Bonus with them.

Table

Results

Nationalliga B

Regular season

Table

Results

Relegation playoffs
Each team was awarded half of the points from the regular season.

Table

Results

Nationalliga A/B playoffs
The teams in the ninth to twelfth positions in Nationalliga A competed with the top four teams of Nationalliga B in a Nationalliga A/B Playoff round.

Table

Results

Sources
RSSSF

Swiss Football League seasons
Swiss
1